Paramantis nyassana is a species of praying mantis in the family Mantidae.  Before a 1998 paper showed it was present in Zimbabwe it was "hitherto unknown in Africa south of the Zambezi River".

References

Mantidae
Mantodea of Africa
Insects of Zimbabwe
Zambezi basin
Insects described in 1912